"Feel Alive" is a single released by ATB from his album Trilogy.

Track listings

Feel Alive (CD single Release) 
01. "Feel Alive" (Airplay Mix) (3:44) 
02. "Feel Alive" (Sunloverz Edit) (3:55)
03. "Feel Alive" (Duende Remix Edit) (3:53) 
04. "Desperate Religion" (Cunningham Remix) (7:53)
05. "Desperate Religion" (Egohead Deluxe Remix) (7:04)

Feel Alive (Vinyl Release Part 1) 
A. "Feel Alive" (A&T Original Club Mix) (9:18)
B. "Feel Alive" (Duende Remix) (10:47)

Feel Alive (Vinyl Release Part 2) 
A. "Feel Alive" (Sunloverz Club Mix) (6:58)
B. "Feel Alive" (Bee-Low Remix)  (6:50)

2007 singles
ATB songs
Songs written by André Tanneberger
2007 songs
Kontor Records singles